The Territorial Prelature of Santa Lucia del Mela was a Roman Catholic territorial prelature in Italy, located in the city of Santa Lucia del Mela, a major commune (municipality) in the administrative Province of Messina in the insular south Italian region of Sicily. In 1986, it was suppressed and merged with the Diocese of Lipari into the Metropolitan Archdiocese of Messina to form the Archdiocese of Messina-Lipari-Santa Lucia del Mela.

History 
 TO ELABORATE
 1206: Established as Territorial Prelature of Santa Lucia del Mela, on Sicilian territory split off from the Diocese of Patti
 On 30 September 30, 1986: Suppressed to the Archdiocese of Messina-Lipari-Santa Lucia del Mela

Ordinaries 
Territorial Prelates of Santa Lucia del Mela

Jaime de Conchillos, O. de M. (1505 Appointed – 25 Feb 1509), next Bishop of Catania)
...
Girolamo Riggio (1585 – 1589 Died)
Juan d'Espinar (1590 – 1601 Died)
Simone Rao Grimaldi (15 Aug 1602 – 12 March 1616 Died)
Antonio Franco (bishop) (12 Nov 1616 – 2 Sep 1626 Died)
Vincenzo Fimratura (24 March 1628 – 3 March 1648 Died)
Martino La Farina (21 Sep 1648 – 17 Sep 1668 Died)
Simone Impellizzeri (29 July 1670 – Aug 1701 Died)
Carlo Massa (4 Dec 1702 – 26 Dec 1704 Died)
Pedro Solerá Montoya ( 1709 – 31 March 1711 Died)
Francesco Barabàra (May 1712 – 15 Jan 1732 Died)
Antonio Ura (15 Oct 1732 – 28 Oct 1735 Died)
Marcello Moscella (5 Jan 1736 – 10 April 1760 Died)
Scipione Ardoino Alcontres, C.R. (19 Dec 1767 – 17 June 1771), next Archbishop of Messina)
Emanuello Rao-Torres (18 Dec 1771 – 14 April 1778 Died)
Carlo Santacolomba (1780 – 13 July 1801 Died)
Alfonso Airoldi (1803 – 25 March 1817 Died)
Gabriello Maria Gravina, O.S.B. (Jan 1818 – 18 April 1840 Died)
Giacomo Coccia (15 Sep 1818 – 4 June 1829 Died)
Ignazio Avolio (1834 – 22 Feb 1844 Resigned)
Paolo Maria Mondio ( 1850 – 4 Sep 1857 Died)
Ignazio Carlo Vittore Papardo del Parco, C.R. (27 Sep 1858 – 27 Oct 1871), next Bishop of Patti)
Gaetano Blandini (12 Aug 1880 – 15 March 1883), next Coadjutor Bishop of Agrigento)
Stefano Gerbino di Cannitello, O.S.B. (3 June 1890 – 29 Nov 1895), next Bishop of Trapani)
Giuseppe Fiorenza (15 Dec 1895 – 22 June 1896), next Archbishop of Siracusa)
Vincenzo Di Giovanni (21 Oct 1896 – 4 March 1901 Resigned)
Salvatore Ballo Guercio (8 March 1920 – 18 Sep 1933), next Bishop of Mazara del Vallo)
Antonio Mantiero (11 June 1935 – 24 Aug 1936), next Bishop of Treviso)
Luciano Geraci (6 March 1937 – 20 July 1946 Died)
Luigi Cammarata (4 Dec 1946 – 24 Feb 1950 Died)
Guido Tonetti (25 July 1950 – 16 Feb 1957), next Archbishop (Personal Title) of Cuneo)
Francesco Ricceri (16 March 1957 – 15 May 1961), next Bishop of Trapani)
Francesco Tortora, O.M. (19 Mar 1962 – 21 Oct 1972), next Bishop of Gerace-Locri)
Ignazio Cannavò (20 Dec 1976 – 30 Sep 1986), next Archbishop of Messina-Lipari-Santa Lucia del Mela.

See also 
 List of Catholic dioceses in Italy

References 

Territorial prelatures